Heorhiy Semenovych Zhylin (18 August 1925 – 12 September 1997) was a Ukrainian rower who competed for the Soviet Union in the 1952 Summer Olympics and in the 1956 Summer Olympics.

In 1952 he won the silver medal with his partner Ihor Yemchuk in the double sculls event.

Four years later he was a crew member of the Soviet boat which won the bronze medal in the coxed pairs competition.

References

External links
 

1925 births
1997 deaths
Ukrainian male rowers
Soviet male rowers
Olympic rowers of the Soviet Union
Rowers at the 1952 Summer Olympics
Rowers at the 1956 Summer Olympics
Olympic silver medalists for the Soviet Union
Olympic bronze medalists for the Soviet Union
Olympic medalists in rowing
Sportspeople from Kyiv
Medalists at the 1956 Summer Olympics
Medalists at the 1952 Summer Olympics
European Rowing Championships medalists
Honoured Masters of Sport of the USSR